There were 1 female and 9 male athletes representing the country at the 2000 Summer Paralympics. Competitors from Cuba won 8 medals, including 4 golds, 2 silvers, and 2 bronzes to finish ranked 34th.

Medal table

See also
Cuba at the 2000 Summer Olympics
Cuba at the Paralympics

References

Bibliography

External links
International Paralympic Committee

Nations at the 2000 Summer Paralympics
Paralympics
2000
Disability in Cuba